{{Taxobox
| name = Paralaoma servilis
| image = Paralaoma servilis (MNHN-IM-2010-13272).jpeg
| image_caption = shell] of Paralaoma servilis (specimen at MNHN, Paris)
| regnum = Animalia
| phylum = Mollusca
| classis = Gastropoda
| unranked_superfamilia = clade Heterobranchia
clade Euthyneuraclade Panpulmonata
clade Eupulmonata
clade Stylommatophora
informal group Sigmurethra
| superfamilia = Punctoidea
| familia = Punctidae
| subfamilia = 
| genus = Paralaoma
| species = P. servilis
| binomial = Paralaoma servilis
| binomial_authority = (Shuttleworth, 1852)
| synonyms = 
 Helix (Discus) derelicta Legrand, 1871 (junior synonym)
 Helix (Helicella) pusilla R. T. Lowe, 1831 (name preoccupied; non Helix pusilla Vallot, 1801)
 Helix (Patula) cryophila E. von Martens, 1865 (junior synonym)
 Helix (Patula) stellata Brazier, 1871 (junior synonym)
 Helix arenicola Tate, 1878 (unavailable: not Helix arenicola Lowe, Lowe, 1854)
 Helix caputspinulae Reeve, 1852 (junior synonym)
 Helix discors Petterd, 1902 (junior synonym)
 Helix epsilon L. Pfeiffer, 1853
 Helix hobarti Cox, 1868 (junior synonym)
 Helix morti Cox, 1864 (junior synonym)
 Helix mucoides Tenison Woods, 1879 (junior synonym)
 Helix paradoxa Cox, 1864 (junior synonym)
 Helix salaziensis G. Nevill, 1870 (junior synonym)
 Helix servilis Shuttleworth, 1852 (original combination)
 Helix similis Cox, 1868 (junior synonym)
 Helix sitiens Legrand, 1871 (junior synonym)
 Helix tenuicostata L. Pfeiffer, 1846 (junior synonym)
 Hyalina conspecta Bland, 1865
 Microphysa pumila Hutton, 1882
 Paralaoma caputspinulae (Reeve, 1852) (junior synonym)
 Paralaoma decresensis Iredale, 1937 (junior synonym)
 Paralaoma duncombei Iredale, 1945 (junior synonym)
 Paralaoma pumila (Hutton, 1882)
 Paralaoma raoulensis' Iredale, 1913 (junior synonym)
 Paralaoma royi Iredale, 1944 (junior synonym)
 Paralaoma stabilis Iredale, 1937 (junior synonym)
 Paraloma servilis (Shuttleworth, 1852) (incorrect spelling of generic name)
 Patula lederi O. Boettger, 1880 (junior synonym)
 Pleuropunctum micropleuros
 Punctum conspectum (Bland, 1865) (junior synonym)
 Punctum conspectum alleni Pilsbry in Pilsbry & Ferriss, 1919
 Punctum conspectum var. pasadenae Pilsbry, 1896 (junior synonym)
 Punctum cryophilum (E. von Martens, 1865)
 Punctum lederi (O. Boettger, 1880) (invalid combination)
 Punctum lederi var. meridionalis O. Boettger, 1905 (junior synonym)
 Radiodiscus misiollemis Hylton Scott, 1957 (junior synonym)
 Radiodiscus misionensis Hylton Scott, 1957
 Radiodiscus pilsbryi Hylton Scott, 1957
 Subfectola caputspinulae (Reeve, 1852) (junior synonym)
 Tachyphasis (Tachyphasis) salaziensis (Nevill, 1870)
 Toltecia pusilla (Lowe, 1831)
 Zonites diegoensis Hemphill in W. G. Binney, 1892
}}Paralaoma servilis''' is a species of very small air-breathing land snail, a terrestrial pulmonate gastropod mollusk or micromollusk in the family Punctidae, the dot snails. 

Distribution
The native range for this species is thought to be New Zealand. However, the species is known to occur worldwide in numerous countries and islands outside of its native range, including:
 Great Britain
 Uganda
 Kenya
 Tanzania
 Belgium
 France

References

 Van den Neucker T. & Ronsmans J. (2015). The globally invasive Paralaoma servilis'' (Gastropoda: Punctidae) reported for the first time in Belgium. Journal of Conchology 42(1):95-96. PDF
 Martens, E. von. (1865). Uebersicht der Land-und Süsswasser-Mollusken des Nil-Gebietes. Malakozoologische Blätter. 12 (4): 177-192; 12 (5): 192-207 
 Spencer, H.G., Marshall, B.A. & Willan, R.C. (2009). Checklist of New Zealand living Mollusca. Pp 196-219. in: Gordon, D.P. (ed.) New Zealand inventory of biodiversity. Volume one. Kingdom Animalia: Radiata, Lophotrochozoa, Deuterostomia. Canterbury University Press,
 Neubert, E. (1998). Annotated checklist of the terrestrial and freshwater molluscs of the Arabian Peninsula with descriptions of new species. Fauna of Arabia. 17: 333-461.
 Rosenberg, G. & Muratov, I. V. (2006). Status report on the terrestrial Mollusca of Jamaica. Proceedings of the Academy of Natural Sciences of Philadelphia. 155: 117-161; Erratum: 156: 401 (2007).
 Hausdorf, B. (2002). Introduced Land Snails and Slugs in Colombia. Journal of Molluscan Studies, 68 (2): 127-131.
 Bruggen, A. C. van. (2007). Terrestrial molluscs recorded from Mt. Mulanje, Malaŵi. Nyala. 24: 17–37
 Brook, F.J. & Ablett, J.D. (2019). Type material of land snails (Mollusca: Gastropoda) described from New Zealand by taxonomists in Europe and North America between 1830 and 1934, and the history of research on the New Zealand land snail fauna from 1824 to 1917. Zootaxa. 4697: 1-117.

External links 
 AnimalBase page for this species at: 
 Shuttleworth, R. J. (1852). Diagnosen einiger neuen Mollusken aus den Canarischen Inseln. Mittheilungen der Naturforschenden Gesellschaft in Bern. 1852 (241/242): 137-146. Bern
 redale, T. (1913). The land Mollusca of the Kermadec islands. Proceedings of the Malacological Society of London. 10(6): 364-388, pl. 18
 Reeve, L. A. (1851-1854). Monograph of the genus Helix. In: Conchologia iconica, or, illustrations of the shells of molluscous animals, vol. 7, pls. 1-210 and unpaginated text. L. Reeve & Co., London.
 Pfeiffer, L. (1846). Symbolae ad historiam Heliceorum. Sectio tertia. 1–100. Cassellis: Th. Fischer
 Nevill, G. (1870). On the land shells of Bourbon, with descriptions of a few new species. The Journal of the Asiatic Society of Bengal, Part II, 39 (4): 403-416. Calcutta 
 Iredale, T. (1944). The land Mollusca of Lord Howe Island. The Australian Zoologist. 10(3): 299-334
 Boettger, O. (1880). Diagnoses molluscorum novorum ab ill. Hans Leder in regione caspia Talysch dicta lectorum. Jahrbücher der Deutschen Malakozoologischen Gesellschaft. 7 (4): 379-383. Frankfurt am Main
 Boettger, O. (1905). Die Konchylien aus den Anspülungen des Sarus-Flusses bei Adana in Cilicien. Nachrichtsblatt der Deutschen Malakozoologischen Gesellschaft. 37 (3): 97-123, pl. 2a. Frankfurt am Main

servilis
Gastropods described in 1852